The Strange Vice of Mrs. Wardh (Italian: Lo strano vizio della Signora Wardh) is a 1971 giallo mystery film directed by Sergio Martino, and starring Edwige Fenech, George Hilton, Ivan Rassimov, and Alberto de Mendoza. Its plot follows the wife of a diplomat who finds herself being stalked by her former abusive lover in Vienna.

The letter "h" was added to the name "Ward" when an Italian woman named Mrs. Ward threatened legal action over the original title's potentially damaging her good name, just before the film was released. The film was originally released under the title Blade of the Ripper in the United States. It was also released under the alternate titles Next! and The Next Victim.

Plot  
In Vienna, a homicidal maniac is killing women with a straight razor. Julie Wardh and her diplomat husband, Neil, return to the city after time spent in New York City. Julie married Neil to escape her abusive former lover, Jean, who lives in Vienna. Jean begins stalking Julie, and she grows increasingly anxious. Meanwhile, a series of violent murders of women are occurring in Vienna.

At a high society party, Julie's friend Carol introduces her Australian cousin George. George and Carol's wealthy uncle has just died, and they are his only heirs. George flirts with Julie, who is unhappy in her marriage to the neglectful Neil. After a lunch date, George and Julie begin an affair. Julie receives a call from a blackmailer who threatens to tell Neil about the affair. Julie suspects Jean is the blackmailer, and Carol insists on meeting the blackmailer in Julie's place. Carol goes to meet the unknown individual in a forested park, where she is attacked and slashed to death by someone wielding a straight razor. 

When Julie learns about Carol's murder, she urges the police to investigate Jean, whom she suspects is the razor killer given his sadomasochistic tendencies. Jean has an airtight alibi. Julie is then attacked in the parking garage by a figure with a straight razor, and barely escapes with her life. Terrified, Julie accepts George's invitation to leave the city (and her husband) for Spain.

Back in Vienna, the razor killer dies at the hands of an intended victim. Julie is ecstatic when she reads that the killer is dead and that he was a stranger to her. However, someone continues to stalk Julie in Spain, causing her to have a nervous breakdown. When George goes to get a doctor, Julie is ambushed and knocked out by Jean. Jean stages the scene to look like Julie committed suicide by carbon monoxide poisoning. When George returns with the doctor, she is almost dead.

At the police station later, George learns that Julie has in fact died, and they consider her death a suicide. George drives to a remote location where he meets Jean. George hired Jean to murder Julie and stage it as a suicide. Jean demands his money, but instead George shoots him and arranges the scene as a suicide.

George then meets with Neil, Julie's husband. As they drive, their conversation reveals that they have conspired to murder Carol and Julie and stage it as the work of the razor killer. Carol's death makes George the sole inheritor of his uncle's fortune, while Julie's death means a huge insurance payment for Neil. To avoid police suspicion given these clear motives, Neil killed Carol (while George had a perfect alibi), and George tried to kill Julie in the parking garage (while Neil had a perfect alibi). After the razor killer died, it no longer made sense for George to kill Julie with a razor, so he instead hired Jean to stage Julie's murder as suicide while both George and Neil had alibis.

The police appear, and George and Neil, trying to evade them, drive off a cliff to their deaths. It is revealed that Julie is not dead, but was saved by the doctor. The police faked her death to trick George and Neil into meeting; they were suspicious after Carol's autopsy revealed that her murder, though committed with a razor, did not fit the razor killer's modus operandi. Julie is consoled by the handsome young doctor as they drive away.

Cast

Critical reception 

AllMovie wrote, "Sergio Martino's first entry into Italy's giallo genre delivers everything this style of thriller requires and then some", calling it "a skillful example of how the giallo can be a head-spinning experience in style over substance."

See also   
 List of Italian films of 1971

References

External links 
 
 The Strange Vice of Mrs. Wardh at Allmovie.com

1971 films
1971 crime films
1971 horror films
BDSM in films
Italian horror thriller films
Italian mystery thriller films
1970s Italian-language films
Films about stalking
Films directed by Sergio Martino
Films set in Vienna
Films set in Spain
Giallo films
1970s crime thriller films
Films produced by Luciano Martino
Films scored by Nora Orlandi
1970s Italian films